IBL may refer to:

Technology 

 International Brain Laboratory, a collaborative research group in neuroscience
 Image-based lighting, an image rendering technique
 Inbred backcross lines, a breeding technique
 InBound Links, a metric used by search engines
 Instance-based learning, a family of machine learning algorithms (e.g. KNN, PEL-C, IBL-1, IBL-2 and IBL-3)
 Indigo Bay Lodge Airport, an airport in Mozambique (IATA code IBL)
 Ion beam lithography, a microfabrication technique

Sports 

 Indonesian Basketball League, formerly called the National Basketball League
 Indian Badminton League
 Intercounty Baseball League, a baseball league in Canada
 International Basketball League (1999–2001), basketball league in the United States
 International Basketball League (2005–2014), a basketball league in the United States
 Italian Baseball League
 Israel Baseball League

Other 

 In before lock, an Internet slang
 Inquiry-based learning, a teaching method
 International Brotherhood of Longshoremen, a labor union in North America
 Industrial Bus Lines, an American bus company